Glenageary (meaning "Glen of the Sheep") is an area in the suburbs of Dún Laoghaire–Rathdown, Ireland. While there is no officially defined boundary, it is surrounded by the areas of Dalkey, Dún Laoghaire, Glasthule, Johnstown, Killiney and Sallynoggin. The Church of Ireland does have a defined boundary for the Parish of Glenageary.

On early 20th century maps, Glenageary and Sallynoggin are considered to be the same place and it was not until the building of local authority houses in the late 1940s and 1950s in the townlands of Honeypark and Thomastown by Dún Laoghaire Borough Corporation that a clear distinction between Sallynoggin and Glenageary was created.

The Roman Catholic Parish of Glasthule covers all of Glasthule and Sandycove together with Glenageary east of Upper Glenageary Road and south of Lower Glenageary Road.

History 
Until the late 1940s, Glenageary, like much of the south County Dublin, consisted mostly of large manor estates - each comprising a large house, some woodland and cultivated or landscaped fields. Since then it has been extensively redeveloped. Most of the original manors have been demolished and low-density housing developments built.

Glenageary has one church, St Paul's at the junction of Adelaide and Silchester Roads, which is a (Church of Ireland) church. It was opened in 1868.

Transport 
The area is served by Dublin Bus, routes 7 (Every 30 minutes. 40 minutes on Sundays.) and 59 (every hour). Other routes nearby in Sallynoggin include the 7a, 45a and 111 although these vary in frequency and service periods. Glenageary has its own railway station which is served by Iarnród Éireann's DART that provides service between Greystones to the south, and Howth and Malahide to the north. Glenageary railway station opened on 1 November 1867.

People 
 Sinéad O'Connor and her novelist brother Joseph O'Connor spent some of their early lives in Glenageary
 Niall Connolly, one of the Colombia Three, spent his childhood in Glenageary
 Colm Ó Cíosóig, musician and drummer of My Bloody Valentine, is from Glenageary
 John Dowse was an Irish-born British Army medical officer in World Wars I and II.
 Raonaid Murray, a 17-year-old resident, was murdered on Silchester Road on 4 September 1999 near her home.

See also 
List of towns and villages in Ireland

References

Further reading

External links 
 Dún Laoghaire-Rathdown County Council
 St Paul's Church, Glenageary

Places in Dún Laoghaire–Rathdown